Shafir Regional Council (Mo'atza Azorit Shafir) is a regional council in the Southern District of Israel near the city of Kiryat Gat.

The council is bordered on the north by the Be'er Tuvia Regional Council, on the east by Yoav Regional Council and Kiryat Gat, on the south by Lakhish Regional Council, and on the west by Hof Ashkelon Regional Council, Yoav Regional Council.

The council is named for the Biblical city of Shafir.

List of settlements

Kibbutz
Ein Tzurim

Moshavim

Eitan
Komemiyut
Masu'ot Yitzhak
No'am
Revaha
Shalva
Shafir
Uza
Zavdiel
Zrahia

Villages 
Aluma
Even Shmuel
Merkaz Shapira

 
Regional councils in Israel
1950 establishments in Israel